Connaghan is a surname. Notable people with the surname include:

 Denis Connaghan (born 1945), Scottish footballer
 Denis Connaghan (footballer, born 1976) (born 1976), Scottish footballer

See also
 Conaghan
 Connachan